Cennan is a town of Li County in Hunan, China. The town has 10 villages and a community under its jurisdiction, its seat is Zengjiahe Community.

History
The township of Cennan was formed in 1928. It was reorganized as a commune in 1958 and a township in 1984. It was reorganized to as a town through the amalgamation of the former township of Cennan, 8 villages of Lidong Township and the Cengnan Flood Storage Area on November 23, 2015. Minyan Village was transferred to Lidan Subdistrict in 2017.

Subdivisions
Through the amalgamation of village-level divisions in 2016, its divisions were reduced to 11 villages and a community from 23 villages and a community. in 2017, Minyan Village was transferred to Lidan Subdistrict in 2017, the town of Cenan has 10 villages and a communities under its jurisdiction.

a community
 Zengjiahe Community

10 villages	
 Beiminhu Village
 Cuijiaqang Village
 Dongtianyan Village
 Heimadang Village
 Heli Village
 Jijiaocheng Village
 Shanghekou Village
 Shuanglin Village
 Shuangpu Village
 Tuanjie Village

External links
 Official Website

References

Li County, Hunan
Towns of Hunan